Yemtsa is a rural locality (a settlement) in Plesetsky District of Arkhangelsk Oblast, Russia, located  north of Plesetsk and  south of Arkhangelsk. Within the framework of municipal divisions, it serves as the administrative center of Yemtsovskoye Rural Settlement, one of the thirteen rural settlements in the district. Population: .

Etymology
The name of the settlement is derived from the Yemtsa River, which, however, flows at some distance from the settlement.

History
In 1894—1897, Yemtsa railway station was built during the construction of the railroad between Vologda and Arkhangelsk. Yemtsa was incorporated in 1943 with a decree No. 617/5 of the Presidium of the Supreme Soviet of RSFSR by merging a number of settlements. Previously, it was located on the territory of Savinsky Selsoviet, with the center in Savinsky.

During the Russian Civil War in 1918, heavy battles were fought between the Red Army and the British troops around Yemtsa. A monument to the Red Army is situated near the train station.

Yemtsa had work settlement status until it was demoted to a rural locality in February 2013.

Economy
There is a railway station in Yemtsa situated on the Plesetskaya–Obozerskaya line of the railroad connecting Moscow with Arkhangelsk. Yemtsa is located on the highway connecting Kargopol with one of the principal highways in Russia, M8 between Moscow and Arkhangelsk (the highways meet in the village of Brin-Navolok northwest of Yemtsa). This is the historic trading route which connected Kargopol with Arkhangelsk before the railroad was built, and long stretches of this road are still unpaved.

The economy of the settlement is based on logging and railway transport.

References

Notes

Sources

Rural localities in Plesetsky District